Ivi Eenmaa (born 2 June 1943) is an Estonian politician.

She was the head of the Estonian National Library from 1993 to 1997. After this, she entered politics, becoming a member of the now defunct Estonian Coalition Party. From 1997 to 1999, she was the mayor of Tallinn. She was Tallinn's first and to date only woman mayor.

Later, she joined the Estonian Reform Party and became the mayor of Võru in 2005. In 2007 she was elected to the Riigikogu and left this position.

References
Ivi Eenmaa. Parliament of Estonia

Women mayors of places in Estonia
1943 births
Living people
Mayors of Tallinn
Members of the Riigikogu, 1999–2003
Members of the Riigikogu, 2007–2011
Members of the Riigikogu, 2015–2019
Members of the Riigikogu, 2019–2023
Estonian Reform Party politicians
Estonian Coalition Party politicians
21st-century Estonian women politicians
Women members of the Riigikogu
Recipients of the Order of the White Star, 4th Class
20th-century Estonian politicians
21st-century Estonian politicians
Members of the Riigikogu, 2003–2007